Girard Township is a township in Clearfield County, Pennsylvania, United States. The population was 565 at the 2020 census.

Geography

Communities
Bald Hill
Congress Hill
Coudley
Gillingham
Lecontes Mills
Surveyor

Demographics

As of the census of 2000, there were 674 people, 251 households, and 197 families residing in the township.  The population density was 10.6 people per square mile (4.1/km).  There were 496 housing units at an average density of 7.8/sq mi (3.0/km).  The racial makeup of the township was 99.70% White, 0.15% Native American and 0.15% Asian. Hispanic or Latino of any race were 0.15% of the population.

There were 251 households, out of which 37.8% had children under the age of 18 living with them, 64.5% were married couples living together, 10.0% had a female householder with no husband present, and 21.5% were non-families. 18.7% of all households were made up of individuals, and 9.6% had someone living alone who was 65 years of age or older.  The average household size was 2.69 and the average family size was 3.06.

In the township the population was spread out, with 27.7% under the age of 18, 7.9% from 18 to 24, 30.4% from 25 to 44, 22.8% from 45 to 64, and 11.1% who were 65 years of age or older.  The median age was 35 years. For every 100 females, there were 98.2 males.  For every 100 females age 18 and over, there were 101.2 males.

The median income for a household in the township was $29,500, and the median income for a family was $32,083. Males had a median income of $30,156 versus $16,985 for females. The per capita income for the township was $15,142.  About 15.7% of families and 19.8% of the population were below the poverty line, including 25.8% of those under age 18 and 13.4% of those age 65 or over.

Education
Students in Girard Township attend schools in the Clearfield Area School District.

References

Populated places established in 1818
Townships in Clearfield County, Pennsylvania
Townships in Pennsylvania